The Steinbach Hawks were a Canadian junior 'A' ice hockey team based in Steinbach, Manitoba that played in the Manitoba Junior Hockey League (MJHL) from 1985 to 1988.

After only three seasons in the MJHL, the Hawks took leave of absence following the 1987-1988 season and formally ceased operations two years later.  The league added the Winnipeg-based Southeast Thunderbirds for the 1988-1989 season to counter the loss of the Hawks.  That team eventually relocated to Steinbach in 2009 is today known as the Steinbach Pistons.

Season-by-season record
Note: GP = Games Played, W = Wins, L = Losses, T = Ties, OTL = Overtime Losses, GF = Goals for, GA = Goals against

Playoffs
1986 Lost Quarter-final
Winkler Flyers defeated Steinbach Hawks 4-games-to-none
1987 Lost Quarter-final
St. Boniface Saints defeated Steinbach Hawks 4-games-to-none
1988 DNQ

References

External links
 Steinbach Hawks season statistics and records at The Internet Hockey Database

Defunct Manitoba Junior Hockey League teams
Sport in Steinbach, Manitoba